John William Hamilton Anderson (1912 - date of death unknown), was a British born, South African international lawn bowler.

Bowls career
He won a gold medal in the fours at the 1954 British Empire and Commonwealth Games in Vancouver, with Frank Mitchell, Wilfred Randall and George Wilson.

He won the 1949 rinks at the National Championships, bowling for the Durban Bowls Club.

Personal life
He was an company director by trade.

References

1912 births
Date of death unknown
Bowls players at the 1954 British Empire and Commonwealth Games
South African male bowls players
Commonwealth Games gold medallists for South Africa
Commonwealth Games medallists in lawn bowls
British emigrants to South Africa
Medallists at the 1954 British Empire and Commonwealth Games